Khachik may refer to:
 Khatchik (disambiguation), a given name
 Khachik, Armenia, a town
 Khachik, Iran, a village